Piano Vibrations is a studio album by English keyboardist Rick Wakeman, released in 1971 by Polydor Records. Recorded when Wakeman was a session musician and a member of the folk rock group The Strawbs, it features covers of pop, jazz, and folk songs with Wakeman on piano, John Schroeder and his orchestra, and an unknown lead vocalist. Wakeman was paid a total of £36 for the four sessions it took to record the album. His name, and that of the lead vocalist, are not written on the cover.

Track listing

Side one
"Take Me to the Pilot" (Elton John, Bernie Taupin) – 3:00
"Yellow Man" (Randy Newman) – 2:36
"Cast Your Fate to the Wind" (Vince Guaraldi, Carel Werber) – 2:35
"Gloria, Gloria" (John Schroeder, Anthony King) – 3:08
"Your Song" (Elton John, Bernie Taupin) – 3:45

Side two
"Delta Lady" (Leon Russell) – 3:26
"A Picture of You" (John Schroeder, Anthony King) – 2:59
"Home Sweet Oklahoma" (Leon Russell) – 3:22
"Fire and Rain" (James Taylor) – 3:25
"Classical Gas" (Mason Williams) – 2:56

Personnel
Rick Wakeman – grand piano
John Schroeder orchestra
Unknown singer

References

1971 debut albums
Rick Wakeman albums
Polydor Records albums